Henry H. Denhardt (March 8, 1876 – September 20, 1937) was a Democratic American politician and retired brigadier general in the United States Army, who served as the 34th Lieutenant Governor of Kentucky from 1923 to 1927, under Governor William J. Fields.

Denhardt was born in Bowling Green, Kentucky. In November, 1936 he was charged with the murder of his girlfriend, Verna Garr Taylor, and tried in New Castle, Kentucky. The trial ended with a hung jury. Before he could be tried a second time, he was shot to death by Taylor's brothers at the Armstrong Hotel in Shelbyville, Kentucky on September 20, 1937.

See also
List of assassinated American politicians

Sources
The Political Graveyard
Louisville Courier Journal

Lieutenant Governors of Kentucky
Deaths by firearm in Kentucky
1937 deaths
Politicians from Bowling Green, Kentucky
1876 births
United States Army generals